Statistics of Kyrgyzstan League for the 2008 season.

Overview
It was contested by 9 teams, and Dordoi-Dynamo Naryn won the championship after beating Abdish-Ata Kant in an end of season playoff final after both sides had the same number of points in the regular season.

Final league standings

References
Kyrgyzstan - List of final tables (RSSSF)

Kyrgyzstan League seasons
1
Kyrgyzstan
Kyrgyzstan